The Hawaii Institute of Marine Biology (HIMB) is  a marine biology laboratory located on the state-owned Coconut Island in Kāneohe Bay.

History
The institute was established in 1912. It began as a wooden structure on the shores of Waikiki and originally functioned in conjunction with the Waikiki Aquarium until 1919 when both operations became part of the University of Hawai‘i. In 1947 a group of wealthy oil tycoons, including Edwin W. Pauley, bought Coconut Island. Pauley donated a part of the island to the university for use as a marine laboratory for the study of the marine sciences.
In 1993, the Pauley family donated the remaining private part of Coconut Island for the construction of a world-class marine laboratory.

In 2008, the institute was seeking 57 million dollars through state-issued bonds for the construction of a  marine research facility. The site is on the southeast side of the island. This is part of the master plan approved by the University of Hawaii's Board of Regents in 1998, which includes the addition of several research buildings, laboratories, and conference facilities. These will be funded on a case-by-case basis. The intent is to turn Coconut Island into the world's premier coral reef research facility.

Geography
It is part of the University of Hawaii at Manoa. It is the only research facility in the world built on a coral reef.

The boundaries of the Hawaii Marine Laboratory Refuge surrounding the island start at the high-water mark on the island and go to twenty-five feet beyond the outer edges of the reefs, including sand and seawall shoreline, where coral and sand calcium carbonate reef flats are exposed at low tides. High coral and macro-algae flourish at shallow-depth zones while the deep habitats are characterized by sediment with low coral cover and colonized by slumping from upper reef zones. Within Kaneohe Bay are sheltered areas. Man-made impacts in the area include dredging, sewage release and freshwater flooding. The shores of the bay are characterized by coastal development.

Habitat
The HIMB research facilities are used to explore deep-sea habitats where new species may be discovered and documented, as well as shallow reefs which are rich habitats likely to contain undiscovered species.

Programs
Hawai‘i Coral Reef Assessment and Monitoring Program (CRAMP) is located at HIMB. It went on to include rapid quantitative research and habitat mapping, which are tools new used to understand the ecology of the Hawaiian coral reefs in relation to surrounding geographic areas.

One study of the HIMB research projects is on the effects of sound on dolphins.
Another is the study of chemicals in Enchanted Lake.

In 2015, the institute was testing a new form of coral resistant to coral bleaching. The institute also spoke publicly to argue in favor of banning sunscreens with chemicals, as they majorly contribute to coral bleaching.

See also
Hawaiian Islands Humpback Whale National Marine Sanctuary
Hawaii Marine Laboratory Refuge

References

External links
Official website
Hawaiian Islands Humpback Whale National Marine Sanctuary

Biological research institutes in the United States
Protected areas of Hawaii
University of Hawaiʻi
Research institutes in Hawaii
Education in Honolulu County, Hawaii
Research institutes established in 1912
1912 establishments in Hawaii